McColl Center (formerly McColl Center for Art + Innovation) is an artist residency and contemporary art space located at 721 North Tryon Street in Charlotte, North Carolina.
Residencies last from two months to eleven months and are available to visual artists as well as creative people in other disciplines. The mission of McColl Center is to encourage collaboration and interaction between artists and the community at large in an immersive atmosphere.

McColl Center is a 501(c)(3) organization.

Art space
Opened in 1999, McColl Center contains nine individual artist studios, a large scale sculpture facility, many common-use areas, and more than 5,000 square feet of exhibition space. In addition to studio space, McColl Center provides tools and materials for fiber arts, jewelry making, metal fabrication, printmaking, sculpture, painting, photography, ceramics, digital media and woodworking.

The galleries are open on Fridays, Saturdays, and Sundays. Admission is free. Numerous public events include residency openings, exhibitions, and other events for the community and artists to engage.

History
The building housing McColl Center was originally a Presbyterian Church built in 1926. The historic, brick and stone neo-Gothic structure was an active church until 1950 when the church's membership was dissolved. The building stood empty for many years until November 14, 1984, when an accidental fire gutted the interior, leaving only an empty shell. In 1995, Bank of America bought the property with the intention of establishing an artist residency. The bank, with the help of Charlotte's Arts & Science Council, redesigned and rebuilt the interior as a place for artists to live and work. The renovated structure was designed by FMK Architects and was built by Rodgers Builders.  It opened on September 16, 1999, as the Tryon Center for Visual Art. Hugh McColl, Jr., former CEO of Bank of America, was the primary patron and in 2001, to honor him, the name was changed to McColl Center for Visual Art. A third name change occurred in 2014 when it became McColl Center for Art + Innovation. In 2021, the organization announced a renewed direction to put artists first and a new visual identity under the name McColl Center.

Alumni artists-in-residence
The McColl Center has served as a working space and studio for over 400 artists including: 

 Opal Palmer Adisa
 Deborah Aschheim
 Xenobia Bailey
 Joan Bankemper
 Endia Beal
 Sharif Bey
 Ambreen Butt
 Margarita Cabrera
 Rob Carter
 Nick Cave
 Mel Chin 
 Andrea Chung
 Sonya Clark
 Joël Mpah Dooh
 Javier de Frutos
 Carlos Estévez
 Fallen Fruit
 Bill Gaskins
 Mark Steven Greenfield
 Greg Haberny
 Hollis Hammonds
 Michael Harrison
 Heather Hart
 Ralph Helmick
 Joseph Herscher
 Sara Hughes
 Kellie Jones
 Marcia Jones
 Rebecca Kamen
 Sheila Klein
 Alix Lambert
 Robert Lazzarini
 Shaun Leonardo
 Stacy Levy
 Willie Little
 Juan Logan
 Nava Lubelski
 Bradley McCallum
 Beverly McIver
 Aiko Miyanaga
 Franco Mondini-Ruiz
 Liz Nielsen
 Ed Osborn
 Winnie Owens-Hart
 Fahamu Pecou
 Endi E. Poskovic
 Kate Rich
 Erin M. Riley
 Aurora Robson
 Salvatore Scarpitta
 Anthony Schrag
 Dread Scott
 Joyce J. Scott
 Bayeté Ross Smith
 Cedric Smith
 Renee Stout
 Anna Torma
 Mary Tsiongas
 Elizabeth Turk
 Sam Van Aken
 Marion Wilson
 Pamela Z

References

External links
 Official Website
 Alliance of Artists Communities 2019 
 Inside the McColl Center Transformation video history

Artist residencies
Art museums and galleries in North Carolina
Arts organizations established in 1999
1979 establishments in North Carolina
Culture of Charlotte, North Carolina
1999 establishments in North Carolina
Former churches in North Carolina
Buildings and structures completed in 1999